The 1993 Women's Hockey Asia Cup was the third edition of the Women's Hockey Asia Cup. It was held in Hiroshima, Japan from 5 November to 13 November 1993.

South Korea won the title, with China finishing second while India took the third place.

Teams

Results

Group A

Matches

Group B

Matches

First to fourth place classification

Semi-finals

Third place game

Final

Winners

Final standings

References

International women's field hockey competitions hosted by Japan
Women's Hockey Asia Cup
Asia Cup
Women's Hockey Asia Cup
Hockey Asia Cup